Omalogyra is a genus of minute marine gastropod molluscs in the family Omalogyridae.

This genus includes the smallest gastropods, with adult sizes of 1 mm and even less.

Species
Species within the genus Omalogyra include:
 Omalogyra ammonitoides (Powell, 1940)
 Omalogyra antarctica Egorova, 1991
 Omalogyra atomus (Philippi, 1841) - atom snail
 Omalogyra burdwoodiana Strebel, 1908
 Omalogyra densicostata (Jeffreys, 1884) 
 Omalogyra disculus Palazzi, 1988
 Omalogyra fusca Suter, 1908(Jeffreys, 1884)     
 Omalogyra fuscopardalis Rolán, 1992  
 Omalogyra liliputia (Laseron, 1954)
 Omalogyra simplex (Costa O.G., 1861)
 Omalogyra taludana Castellanos, 1989
 Omalogyra undosa Palazzi, 1988
 Omalogyra zebrina Rolán, 1992
Species brought into synonymy
 Omalogyra (Ammonicera) Vayssière, 1893: synonym of Ammonicera Vayssière, 1893
 Omalogyra (Ammonicera) planorbis (Dall, 1927): synonym of Palazzia planorbis (Dall, 1927)
 Omalogyra (Ammonicera) rota Forbes & Hanley, 1850: synonym of Ammonicera rota (Forbes & Hanley, 1850)
 Omalogyra atomus (Philippi, 1841) sensu Arnaud, 1972: synonym of Omalogyra antarctica Egorova, 1991 (misapplication)
 Omalogyra ausonia Palazzi, 1988: synonym of Palazzia ausonia (Palazzi, 1988)
 Omalogyra bicarinata Suter, 1908: synonym of Zerotula bicarinata (Suter, 1908)
 Omalogyra discula Palazzi, 1988: synonym of Omalogyra disculus Palazzi, 1988
 Omalogyra fischeriana Monterosato, 1869: synonym of Ammonicera fischeriana (Monterosato, 1869)
 Omalogyra nodicarinata Sleurs, 1983: synonym of Ammonicera nodicarinata (Sleurs, 1985)
 Omalogyra planorbis (Dall, 1927): synonym of Palazzia planorbis (Dall, 1927)
 Omalogyra pulcherrima Brazier in Henn & Brazier, 1894: synonym of Liotella pulcherrima (Brazier in Henn & Brazier, 1894)
 Omalogyra vangoethemi Sleurs, 1983: synonym of Ammonicera vangoethemi (Sleurs, 1985)

References

 
 Jeffreys, J.G. 1859. Notes on British Mollusca , in answer to Mr William Clark's remarks on "Gleanings in British Conchology". Annals and Magazine of Natural History 3: 496-499
 Jeffreys, J. G. (1860). Sur le mollusque designé par MM. Forbes & Hanley sous le nom de Skenea nitidissima. Journal de Conchyliologie. 8: 108-111.
 Gofas, S.; Le Renard, J.; Bouchet, P. (2001). Mollusca, in: Costello, M.J. et al. (Ed.) (2001). European register of marine species: a check-list of the marine species in Europe and a bibliography of guides to their identification. Collection Patrimoines Naturels, 50: pp. 180–213
  Rolàn, E., 1992. The family Omalogyridae G.O. Sars, 1878 (Mollusca, Gastropoda) in Cuba with description of eight new species. Apex 7(2): 35-46

External links
 Costa, O. G. (1861). Microdoride mediterranea; o, Descrizione de poco ben conosciuti od affatto ignoti viventi minuti e micoscropici del Meditterraneo, pel professore O. G. Costa. Tomo primo. Con tredici tavole. i-xviii, 1-80. Stamperia dell'Iride, Napoli
 Laseron, C. F. (1954). Revision of the Liotiidae of New South Wales. The Australian Zoologist. 12 (1): 1-25
 Tate R. 1868. Appendix to the Manual of the Mollusca of S.P. Woodward, A.L.S. London, Virtue & Co., 86 pp

Omalogyridae